Martha Ansara (born 9 September 1942) is a documentary filmmaker whose films on social issues have won international prizes and been screened in Australia, the UK, Europe and North America. Ansara was one of the first women in Australia to work as a cinematographer, is a full member of the Australian Cinematographers Society (ACS) and was inducted into the ACS Hall of Fame in 2015. Martha is a Life Member of the Australian Directors Guild and a founding member of Ozdox, the Australian Documentary Forum. She has also worked as a film lecturer and film writer and has been active in the trade union, women's and peace movements.

Background 
Ansara was born in the United States, where her father was a leading figure in the Syrian-Lebanese community and her mother an educator specializing in dyslexia. She migrated to Australia in 1969, becoming involved in the Sydney Filmmakers Co-operative,. She started making films with other young filmmakers through the Co-operative, but was unable to break into the then male-only domain of professional cinematography. However, in 1975, following the birth of her second child, she was admitted as a student in the first three-year full-time course of the Australian Film, Radio and Television School, directed by Professor Jerzy Toeplitz and Head of Program, Storry Walton. There she studied cinematography under Bill Constable and Brian Probyn BSC, working with a group of students which included many filmmakers later to make their mark in Australia and overseas.

After graduating, Ansara gained experience as a camera assistant and starting work as a cinematographer and maker of social documentaries. She began writing reviews and articles on film for Filmnews, the monthly newspaper of the Sydney Filmmakers Co-operative, and then for a range of publications. She organized and taught in the women's film workshops of this period, eventually lecturing in film production at tertiary institutions and conducting short courses in filmmaking throughout Australia. She also worked extensively as an assessor of projects for government film bodies and was involved in promoting the development of women's filmmaking through the Sydney Women's Film Group and the Women's Film Fund of the Australian Film Commission. Martha was the subject of a 2017 Salute organised by Ozdox: The Australian Documentary Forum which surveys the collective history of Australian film in which she was involved: https://www.youtube.com/watch?v=TOPM94NvUJo.

Martha is the mother of three children, including Australian actor Alice Ansara.

1970s, 1980s 
In the 1970s, Ansara formed many of the relationships with filmmakers and activists which she was to sustain in the following decades. She was involved in the anti-Vietnam War movement and joined the Association for International Disarmament and Co-operation, which became People for Nuclear Disarmament (PND). With the support of that organization, she later made one of the first documentaries to be shot by Westerners in Vietnam, Changing the Needle (1982) with peace activist Mavis Robertson and filmmaker Dasha Ross. She subsequently worked with PND as an organizer of the Pacific Peacemaker project to raise awareness of the launching of the first Trident nuclear submarine, and then in producing the anti-nuclear feature film The Pursuit of Happiness (1987) which she directed. The finance for this film was raised largely from private sources, including the proceeds of the sale of the Victoria Cross won at Gallipoli by Hugo Throssell and donated to the project by his son, diplomat and writer Ric Throssell. It was after the making of this film that Ansara was awarded the Australian Film Institute's Byron Kennedy Award.

During this period, Ansara was an active member of the Australian Theatrical and Amusement Employees' Association, becoming the convener of its Motion Picture sub-committee. She was a foundation member of the Rank and File Movement within the union which came to power briefly in the late 1980s.

In 1976, while working in Brewarrina, NSW, on Phillip Noyce's short feature, Backroads, Ansara was introduced to the realities of Aboriginal Australia through community activist and singer Essie Coffey OAM. She subsequently photographed Coffey's film My Survival as an Aboriginal (1979), which she co-produced with Coffey and filmmaker Alec Morgan. Now an Australian classic, the documentary helped fuel international interest in Aboriginal issues. Coffey and Ansara later collaborated once again to make a sequel, My Life As I Live It (1993). In 2017 My Survival as an Aboriginal was selected for restoration by Australia's National Film and Sound Archive.

In 1983, Ansara photographed Lousy Little Sixpence, a ground-breaking documentary on the stolen generation made by Alec Morgan, Aboriginal media pioneer Lester Bostock and his brother, Gerry Bostock. She likewise worked in Western Australia with Aboriginal activist Robert Bropho to photograph Munda Nyuringu (1983, co-director Jan Roberts) and Always Was, Always Will Be (1989), a documentary on the Swan Brewery Dispute, which she and Bropho made together.  In 1989, Ansara, with assistance from Bropho and others involved in the protest, researched and wrote a history of the dispute as a book of the same title with support from a Creative Arts Fellowship at the Humanities Research Centre, Australian National University.

1990s, and beyond 

The writing of the book Always Was, Always Will Be diverted Ansara from a long-term oral history project, begun at the Australian Film, Television and Radio School, to record the memories of Australian cinematographers.  She returned to this project in the early 1990s, gaining a master's degree in Applied History from the University of Technology, Sydney and becoming the founding convener of the Filmmakers Oral History Group (now known as the Film and Broadcast Industries Oral History Group). The members of this group included film producer, writer and historian Joan Long and film historian Graham Shirley, both of whom had been instrumental in the founding of the National Film and Sound Archive (NFSA) with which the group was associated. The group drew together a number of filmmakers interested in recording the oral history of their industry and in 2003 many of these people actively defended the Archive during its damaging transfer to the much smaller Australian Film Commission. Ansara was likewise a founding member of the Archive Forum which lobbied for the establishment of the Archive as a statutory body, a goal finally accomplished in 2008.

In this period, and especially following the birth of her third child in 1982, Ansara gradually stopped working as a cinematographer and increasingly began teaching film, including as a lecturer at the University of Technology, Sydney. She continued to direct and produce occasional documentaries and a silent short drama, The Ballad of Betty and Joe, made with the assistance of students and other filmmakers. In 1999, she attended the Créteil Women's Film Festival (Films de Femmes) where her films were screened in a tribute to Australian Women's Cinema.

In 2003, as a long-time member of the Australian Directors Guild, Ansara joined other documentary-makers in forming Ozdox, the Australian Documentary Forum, which continues to present monthly, screenings and seminars on documentary directions, new technology and industry issues.

In 2005 Ansara, as a member of the Australian Cinematographers Society, was asked to work with the ACS on a photographic history of cinematography in Australia. This project, significantly relying on oral history, became the book, The Shadowcatchers: A history of cinematography in Australia.

Selected filmography 
 1973 Film for Discussion (drama documentary) (director, producer)
 1977 Me and Daphne (short drama) (cinematographer, co-producer)
 1978 Letters from Poland (short drama) (cinematographer)
 1979 Child Welfare (documentary) (cinematographer)
 1979 My Survival as an Aboriginal (documentary) (cinematographer, co-producer)
 1980 Climbers (dance drama) (cinematographer)
 1980 Age Before Beauty (documentary) (cinematographer)
 1981 Flamingo Park (documentary) (cinematographer)
 1982 Changing the Needle (documentary) (co-director/producer, cinematographer)
 1985 Taking a Look (short drama) (cinematographer)
 1985 Rocking the Foundations (documentary) (cinematographer)
 1988 The Pursuit of Happiness (feature drama) (director, producer)
 1994 My Life as I Live It (documentary) (cinematographer, co-director, co-producer)
 2002 Ordinary People (documentary) (producer)
 2005 I Remember 1948 (documentary) (producer)
 2009 The Ballad of Betty and Joe (short drama) (director, co-producer)
2020 Women of Steel (documentary) (consulting producer)

Selected publications 
 Always Was, Always Will Be: The sacred grounds of the Waugal, Kings Park, Perth W.A.: the Old Swan Brewery dispute (1989), Balmain, NSW, Fringe Dwellers of the Swan Valley,  / 0-7316-7571-1
 The Shadowcatchers: A history of cinematography in Australia (2012), North Sydney, Austcine,  https://web.archive.org/web/20080724005613/http://www.shadowcatchers.com.au/

References

Sources
 Don't Shoot Darling!: Women's independent filmmaking in Australia (1987) edited by Annette Blonski, Barbara Creed, Freda Freiberg Greenhouse Publications, 
 Interview with Martha Ansara [sound recording] (1993) Wendy Lowenstein, National Library of Australia, Bib ID: 2084582
 Edge of the Known World (1998) Author: Meredith Quinn and Andrew L. Urban (edited by); Publisher: AFTRS; .
 Trauma Culture: The politics of terror and loss in media and literature (2005), Elizabeth Ann Kaplan, New Brunswick, N.J. [u.a.]: Rutgers University Press

 External links 
 Martha Ansara at the Internet Movie Database
 Martha Ansara at http://www.balladfilms.com.au/ansara.html
 Martha Ansara at http://www.shadowcatchers.com.au/about.html
 The New York Times, Movies & TV database http://movies.nytimes.com/person/584372/Martha-Ansara/filmography
 Who's Who of Australian Women at http://whoswhowomen.com.au/wellsaid/martha-ansara/
 Ties That Bind: the psyche of feminist filmmaking: Sydney, 1969-1989 at http://epress.lib.uts.edu.au/dspace/handle/2100/974
 Radio National, Movie Time, 'Trash & Treasure: Martha Ansara on Shame''', broadcast on Friday, 28 January 2011 http://www.abc.net.au/radionational/programs/movietime/trash--treasure-martha-ansara-on-shame/3009980

1942 births
Living people
American emigrants to Australia
Australian film directors
Australian women film directors
Australian film producers
Australian cinematographers
American people of Arab descent
Australian documentary filmmakers
Australian women cinematographers
Australian women screenwriters
University of Technology Sydney alumni
Women documentary filmmakers